Rajmata Krishna Kumari Girls' Public School is a residential-cum-day boarding school situated in Jodhpur, Rajasthan, India. The school was founded by HH Maharaja Gaj Singh on 20 July 1992 and named after his mother Her Highness Rajmata Krishna Kumari.

History
Rajmata Krishna Kumari of Jodhpur sought to establish a prestigious English medium school for girls in western Rajasthan. Her son Maharaja Gaj Singh founded Rajmata Krishna Kumari Girls' Public School in the summer of 1992 by  donating a part of his personal property known as Saresh Kothi and Bichli Kothi along with other buildings.

The school was established as a residential-cum-day boarding primary school with only 60 girls. Mrs. Jyotsna Brar was its founder principal and the current principal is Mrs. Neera Singh. The school has now grown to a senior secondary school with over 1500 students. The co-education facility exists up till class V. The school follows the Central Board of Secondary Education (CBSE) curriculum. Alumni of the school are referred to as Aarkekians.

Houses
Four houses - Sri Ambika House, Sri Bhawani House, Sri Durga House and Sri Shakti House are named after the  Hindu goddesses, who are famous for the destruction of demons. Each house is headed by two student officials - a house captain and a vice captain. Apart from sports, there are regular competitions amongst these houses in a variety of disciplines such as dance, music, debating, quizzing, dramatics, elocution (Hindi/English), home science, arts & crafts, needle work & fine arts.

Sports and extra-curricular activities
Students participate in a wide range of sports activities like tennis, volleyball, basketball, badminton, handball, athletics, rhythmic gymnastic and skating and represent in various CBSE cluster, district, zonal, state and national tournaments.

References

External links
Official website
School profile

Girls' schools in Rajasthan
Boarding schools in Rajasthan
Schools in Jodhpur
Educational institutions established in 1992
1992 establishments in Rajasthan